Malaya competed in the 1961 Southeast Asian Peninsular Games held in Rangoon, Burma from 11 to 16 December 1961.

Medal summary

Medals by sport

Medallists

References

1961